Equilibrium isotope fractionation is the partial separation of isotopes between two or more substances in chemical equilibrium. Equilibrium fractionation is strongest at low temperatures, and (along with kinetic isotope effects) forms the basis of the most widely used isotopic paleothermometers (or climate proxies): D/H and 18O/16O records from ice cores, and 18O/16O records from calcium carbonate. It is thus important for the construction of geologic temperature records. Isotopic fractionations attributed to equilibrium processes have been observed in many elements, from hydrogen (D/H) to uranium (238U/235U). In general, the light elements (especially hydrogen, boron, carbon, nitrogen, oxygen and sulfur) are most susceptible to fractionation, and their isotopes tend to be separated to a greater degree than heavier elements.

Definition 
Most equilibrium fractionations are thought to result from the reduction in vibrational energy (especially zero-point energy) when a more massive isotope is substituted for a less massive one. This leads to higher concentrations of the massive isotopes in substances where the vibrational energy is most sensitive to isotope substitution, i.e., those with the highest bond force constants.

In a reaction involving the exchange of two isotopes, X and X, of element "X" in molecules AX and BX,

{A^\mathit{l} X} + B^\mathit{h} X <=> {A^\mathit{h} X} +  B^\mathit{l} X

each reactant molecule is identical to a product except for the distribution of isotopes (i.e., they are isotopologues). The amount of isotopic fractionation in an exchange reaction can be expressed as a fractionation factor:

 indicates that the isotopes are distributed evenly between AX and BX, with no isotopic fractionation.  indicates that X is concentrated in substance AX, and  indicates X is concentrated in substance BX.  is closely related to the equilibrium constant (Keq):

An example of equilibrium isotope fractionation is the concentration of heavy isotopes of oxygen in liquid water, relative to water vapor,

{H2{^{16}O}{(l)}} + {H2{^{18}O}{(g)}} <=> {H2{^{18}O}{(l)}} + {H2{^{16}O}{(g)}}

At 20 °C, the equilibrium fractionation factor for this reaction is

Equilibrium fractionation is a type of mass-dependent isotope fractionation, while mass-independent fractionation is usually assumed to be a non-equilibrium process.

For non-equilibrium reactions, isotopic effects are better described by the GEBIK and GEBIF equations for transient kinetic isotope fractionation, which generalize non-steady isotopic effects in any chemical and biochemical reactions.

Example 
When water vapor condenses (an equilibrium fractionation), the heavier water isotopes (H218O and 2H2O) become enriched in the liquid phase while the lighter isotopes (H216O and 1H2O) tend toward the vapor phase.

Other types of fractionation 
 Kinetic fractionation
 Mass-independent fractionation
 Transient kinetic isotope fractionation

See also
 Equilibrium constant#Effect of isotopic substitution
 Isotope analysis
 Isotope electrochemistry
 Isotope geochemistry
 Kinetic isotope effect
 Stable isotope
 Standard electrode potential

References 

Chacko T., Cole D.R., and Horita J. (2001) Equilibrium oxygen, hydrogen and carbon isotope fractionation factors applicable to geologic systems. Reviews in Mineralogy and Geochemistry, v. 43, p. 1-81.

Horita J. and Wesolowski D.J. (1994) Liquid-vapor fractionation of oxygen and hydrogen isotopes of water from the freezing to the critical temperature. Geochimica et Cosmochimica Acta, v. 58, p. 3425-2437.

External links

AlphaDelta: Stable Isotope fractionation calculator - http://www2.ggl.ulaval.ca/cgi-bin/isotope/generisotope.cgi

Isotope separation
Geochemistry
Fractionation